HD 193472 (HR 7774) is a solitary star in the equatorial constellation Delphinus. It has an apparent magnitude of 5.94, making it visible with the naked eye if viewed under ideal conditions.

HD 193472 has a stellar classification of kA4 hF0 mF2, indicating that its an Am star with the calcium K-line of an A4 star, the hydrogen lines and effective temperature of a F0 star, and the metallic lines of a F2 star. Due to a radius over three times that of the Sun and a relatively low surface gravity, it appears to be slightly evolved.

References

Delphinus (constellation)
Am stars
193472
100256
7774
BD+13 4360